The 2004 Women's Australian Hockey League was the 12th edition women's field hockey tournament. The tournament was held in Perth from 2–14 March 2004.

WA Diamonds won the tournament for the second time after defeating Canberra Strikers 2–1 in the final. QLD Scorchers finished in third place after defeating NSWIS Arrows 2–0 in the third and fourth place playoff.

Participating teams

 Canberra Strikers
 NSWIS Arrows
 Territory Pearls
 QLD Scorchers
 Adelaide Suns
 Tassie Van Demons
 VIS Vipers
 WA Diamonds

Competition format
The 2004 Women's Australian Hockey League consisted of a single round robin format, followed by classification matches.

Teams from all 8 states and territories competed against one another throughout the pool stage. At the conclusion of the pool stage, the top four ranked teams progressed to the semi-finals, while the bottom four teams continued to the classification stage.

Point allocation
All matches had an outright result, meaning drawn matches were decided in either golden goal extra time, or a penalty shoot-out. Match points were as follows:

· 3 points for a win
· 1 points to each team in the event of a draw
· 1 point will be awarded to the winner of the shoot-out
· 0 points to the loser of the match

Results
 All times are local (AWST).

Preliminary round

Fixtures

Classification round

Fifth to eighth place classification

Crossover

Seventh and eighth place

Fifth and sixth place

First to fourth place classification

Semi-finals

Third and fourth place

Final

Awards

Statistics

Final standings

Goalscorers

References

External links

2004
2004 in Australian women's field hockey